Mark Eddiva (born February 16, 1986) is a reputed former Filipino wushu Champion and former mixed martial artist who competed in the featherweight division. He is known for having competed in the Ultimate Fighting Championship (UFC).

Mixed martial arts career 
Eddiva made his professional debut in 2006 competing as a featherweight in regional promotions primarily in the Philippines.  He compiled a record of 5–0, finishing all of his opponents before signing with the UFC in early 2014.

Ultimate Fighting Championship 
Eddiva made his promotional debut against Jumabieke Tuerxun on March 1, 2014 at The Ultimate Fighter: China Finale.  Eddiva controlled Tuerxun on the feet and on the ground en route to a unanimous decision.

Eddiva later faced Kevin Souza on May 31, 2014, at The Ultimate Fighter Brazil 3 Finale. Souza won the fight via TKO due to punches near the end of the second round.  The back and forth action earned by participants Fight of the Night honors.

Eddiva was linked to a fight with Mike De La Torre on November 8, 2014 at UFC Fight Night 55.  However, the pairing was cancelled after both fighters suffered injuries leading up to the event.

Eddiva was expected to face Alex White on May 16, 2015 at UFC Fight Night 66.  However, on April 26, it was announced that White suffered an undisclosed injury and was forced out of the bout.  White was replaced by promotional newcomer Levan Makashvili. Eddiva lost the fight via split decision.

Eddiva faced Dan Hooker on March 20, 2016 at UFC Fight Night 85. He lost the fight via submission in the first round and was subsequently released from the promotion.

Championships and accomplishments
Ultimate Fighting Championship
Fight of the Night (One time)

Mixed martial arts record

|-
| Loss
| align=center| 6–3
| Dan Hooker
| Submission (guillotine choke)
| UFC Fight Night: Hunt vs. Mir
| 
| align=center| 1
| align=center| 1:24
| Brisbane, Australia
| 
|-
| Loss
| align=center| 6–2
| Levan Makashvili
| Decision (split)
| UFC Fight Night: Edgar vs. Faber
| 
| align=center| 3
| align=center| 5:00
| Pasay, Philippines
| 
|-
| Loss
| align=center| 6–1
| Kevin Souza
| TKO (punches)
| The Ultimate Fighter Brazil 3 Finale: Miocic vs. Maldonado
| 
| align=center| 2
| align=center| 4:52
| São Paulo, Brazil
| 
|-
| Win
| align=center| 6–0
| Jumabieke Tuerxun
| Decision (unanimous)
| The Ultimate Fighter China Finale: Kim vs. Hathaway
| 
| align=center| 3
| align=center| 5:00
| Macau, SAR, China
| 
|-
| Win
| align=center| 5–0
| Alex Lee
| Submission (rear-naked choke) 
| Legend Fighting Championship 4
| 
| align=center| 1
| align=center| 4:22
| Hong Kong, SAR, China
| 
|-
| Win
| align=center| 4–0
| Engie Piloto
| Submission (rear-naked choke)
| URCC Cebu 4: Proving Ground
| 
| align=center| 1
| align=center| 3:44
| Mandaue, Philippines
| 
|-
| Win
| align=center| 3–0
| Alvin Clerino
| TKO (punches)
| Sambo Combat Championship 1
| 
| align=center| 1
| align=center| N/A
| Manila, Philippines
| 
|-
| Win
| align=center| 2–0
| Duke Villanueva
| TKO (punches)
| FFC - Relentless
| 
| align=center| 1
| align=center| N/A
| Pasig, Philippines
| 
|-
| Win
| align=center| 1–0
| Andrew Benibe
| TKO (punches)
| FFC - Qualifying
| 
| align=center| 2
| align=center| N/A
| Pasig, Philippines
|

See also
 List of current UFC fighters
 List of male mixed martial artists

References

External links

1986 births
Living people
Sportspeople from Baguio
Filipino male mixed martial artists
Featherweight mixed martial artists
Filipino wushu practitioners
Filipino sanshou practitioners
Asian Games medalists in wushu
Wushu practitioners at the 2006 Asian Games
Wushu practitioners at the 2010 Asian Games
Asian Games bronze medalists for the Philippines
Medalists at the 2010 Asian Games
Southeast Asian Games gold medalists for the Philippines
Southeast Asian Games medalists in wushu
Competitors at the 2009 Southeast Asian Games
Competitors at the 2011 Southeast Asian Games
University of the Cordilleras alumni
Ultimate Fighting Championship male fighters
Mixed martial artists utilizing sanshou